Morell Edward Sharp (September 12, 1920 – October 19, 1980) was a United States district judge of the United States District Court for the Western District of Washington.

Education and career

Born in Portland, Oregon, Sharp was in the United States Army during World War II, from 1942 to 1946, achieving the rank of captain. He received a Juris Doctor from Northwestern University Pritzker School of Law in 1948. He was an assistant general attorney of the Milwaukee Railroad in Chicago, Illinois and Seattle, Washington from 1948 to 1956. He was in private practice in Seattle from 1956 to 1967. He was a judge of the Superior Court of Washington from 1967 to 1970. He was an associate justice of the Supreme Court of Washington from 1970 to 1971. He was a special consultant to the United States Attorney General for court management and reform projects in 1971.

Federal judicial service

Sharp was nominated by President Richard Nixon on November 24, 1971, to a seat on the United States District Court for the Western District of Washington vacated by Judge George Hugo Boldt. He was confirmed by the United States Senate on December 2, 1971, and received his commission on December 9, 1971. Sharp served in that capacity until his death on October 19, 1980.

References

Sources
 

1920 births
1980 deaths
Judges of the United States District Court for the Western District of Washington
United States district court judges appointed by Richard Nixon
20th-century American judges
Justices of the Washington Supreme Court
Lawyers from Portland, Oregon
Northwestern University Pritzker School of Law alumni
United States Army officers
United States Army personnel of World War II